Kodangal is a Town and Mandal in Vikarabad district, Telangana, India. The town is also categorized as a Tahsil, Mandal, or Taluka, and constitutes 20 villages.

The major mandals in the Kodangal Constituency area are:
Kosgi
Kodangal
Bomraspet
Doulathabad
Maddur

Assembly constituency

It is also a Legislative Assembly constituency of the Telangana state in India.
It is known for famous Venkateshwara swami temple. Many pilgrims visit this temple every year. All the rituals performed in this temple are guided by Sri Tirumala Tirupati Devasthanam. Main events in the temple are 
Brahmotsavam ( At the time of Ugadi festival)
Dhanurmasam (At the time of Sankranti- a one month program pooja performed in the early hours)
Laksha Tulasi archana (Third saturday of Shravana Masam)

References

Mandals in Vikarabad district